Parapoynx fluctuosalis or Fluctuating China-mark or Waved China-mark, is a moth of the family Crambidae. It is a widespread species, known from Africa, India, Sri Lanka, China, Japan, Malaysia, Taiwan, Guam, Hawaii, Fiji, Australia and the Galápagos Islands. It is also an introduced species in Europe, where it has been recorded from Great Britain, the Iberian Peninsula and Sardinia.

Adults are sexually dimorphic, with a variable colouration of the wings.

The larvae feed on various grasses growing in water, including Nymphaea species and rice. The larvae are aquatic and form a case of leaf fragments. They live about the bases of their host plants and have occasionally been found on water lily leaves. Young larvae have a pair of long hairs on the dorsum of the terminal segment and there are also some sparse shorter hairs. Later on, it acquires fine filamentous gills enclosing air tubes that join the longitudinal tracheal trunks. The pupa is formed within a case or cocoon.

Subspecies
Parapoynx fluctuosalis fluctuosalis (Africa)
Parapoynx fluctuosalis linealis Guenée, 1854 (Asia)

References

External links

Parapoynx fluctuosalis. CSIRO - Australian Moths Online. Retrieved 22 November 2017.

Acentropinae
Lepidoptera of the Democratic Republic of the Congo
Moths of Japan
Moths of Europe
Moths of Africa